S84 may refer to:
 S84 (New York City bus) serving Staten Island
 Savoia-Marchetti S.84, an Italian airliner